Larry Eugene Poole (born July 31, 1952, in Akron, Ohio) is a former American football running back in the National Football League.  He was drafted by the Cleveland Browns in the ninth round of the 1975 NFL Draft with the 213th overall pick. He played college football at Kent State University.

References

1952 births
Living people
American football running backs
Kent State Golden Flashes football players
Cleveland Browns players